The Byron Arnold collection is an archival collection of Alabama folksong recordings and transcriptions, held at the University of Alabama. The collection was used to publish a 1950 book, Folksongs of Alabama, and later reused for the 2004 Alabama songbook. Several albums have also been published from the collection.

History of the collection
Byron Arnold began collecting Alabama folksongs after joining the piano and organ faculty at the University of Alabama Department of Music in 1937-8. In summer 1945, he made a collecting trip without recording devices.

In 1947, with funding for recording devices, Arnold made field recordings of Alabama music with support from the Folklife Program of the Alabama State Council on the Arts and the Alabama Folklife Association Materials were collected before 1950.

The collection, including reel-to-reel tapes, recording discs, and written transcriptions, was donated to the university upon collector Byron Arnold's death in 1971.

Notable singers recorded
 Vera Hall

Output
The collection has generated 2 books of folksongs, 2 recorded albums, and several scholarly works.

Books
 Folksongs of Alabama, 1950. 
 Alabama Songbook, edited by Robert Halli Jr. University of Alabama Press, 2004.

Recordings
 Cornbread Crumbled in Gravy: Historical Alabama Field Recording from the Byron Arnold Collection of Traditional Tunes, produced by Joy Baklanoff, 1984, for the Alabama Folklife Association. Annotations by folklorist John Bealle
 Bullfrog Jumped: Children's Folksongs From the Byron Arnold Collection, 2007, Alabama Folklife Association

Selected Printed Works using the Collection
 Alabama folk songs in the elementary music class: the Byron Arnold Collection. by Deborah Ann Harhai. Thesis (M.A.)--University of Alabama, 1983.
 Traditional black musical events in West Alabama and Northeast Mississippi, 1940-1960 by Joy Driskell Baklanoff in Essays in honor of Frank J. Gillis, Bloomington, Indiana: Ethnomusicology Publications Group, Indiana University, 1991.

Archival & historical materials
 Byron Arnold Collection of archival materials at the University of Alabama, Byron Arnold collection, 1939-1977, 8.2 linear feet
 Description of the collection, by the collector: Some Historical Folk Songs from Alabama. by Byron Arnold. Journal of the International Folk Music Council. Vol. 6, (1954), pp. 45–47. International Council for Traditional Music https://www.jstor.org/stable/835208

Further reading
 Byron Arnold and the Folksongs of Alabama, Alabama Heritage, Issue 79, winter 2006 
 Byron Arnold, Baker’s Biographical Dictionary of Musicians, 6th ed.

References

Music of Alabama